The Bombardment of Genoa was a military event during the War of the Reunions when France bombarded the city of Genoa from the sea between May 18 and May 28, 1684.

Background
The Republic of Genoa was strategically a very important ally of the Spanish Empire, as the Spanish Duchy of Milan was landlocked. All transport between Spain and Milan went through the port of Genoa. Furthermore, the financing of the Spanish crown by the Genoese bankers had made both countries natural allies ever since 1557, when the state bankruptcy of Philip II had ended the reign of the German Fuggers as Spanish financiers.

After the War of Devolution and the Franco-Dutch War (1672-78), it was clear that France had replaced Spain as the most powerful country in Europe. In October 1683, France annexed some territory in the Spanish Netherlands, starting the War of the Reunions. When Spain sent reinforcements via the port of Genoa, the French decided to punish the city.

French attack
Without a formal declaration of war, a French fleet, commanded by Abraham Duquesne, bombarded the city of Genoa between May 18 and May 28, 1684. About 13,000 cannonballs were shot at the city in ten days time with a pause from May 21–22. The bombardment was terrible for the city and its people because it was the first time in history in which explosive bombs were used, although of stone or iron. The French tried to land troops at Albaro (as a diversion) and Sampierdarena (as the main attack), but they were defeated by Genoese troops and volunteers from the Polcevera valley.

Consequences 

In 1682, François Pidou de Saint Olon had become the first French resident envoy to the Republic of Genoa, and he was actively involved in the bombardment: indeed he communicated precious information to the French about the defence of Genoa and the position of the batteries of guns, being practically a spy.

The Republic of Genoa came under French influence for the next 100 years, although it remained independent and became neutral. The Genoese bankers and traders made new economic and financial links with France.

Notes

Sources
Genova 1684, World History at KMLA

Conflicts in 1684
Battles involving France
Battles involving the Republic of Genoa
1684 in Europe
1684 in the Republic of Genoa
Events in Genoa